Azam Jan (born 5 July 1983) is a Pakistani first-class cricketer who played for Peshawar cricket team.

References

External links
 

1983 births
Living people
Pakistani cricketers
Peshawar cricketers
People from Charsadda District, Pakistan